The 1652 Articles of Peace and Friendship was a treaty signed on 5 July 1652 between the Province of Maryland and the Susquehannock people. The treaty resulted in the Susquehannock conceding the majority of the land from the mouth of the Susquehanna River into Maryland on both shores of the Chesapeake Bay. The treaty effectively signaled the end of Susquehannock life in Maryland.

History
The parties to the treaty signed the document along the banks of the Severn River, near what is now Annapolis. The treaty was signed by five Susquehannock war chiefs whose names were spelled as Sawahegeh, Aurotaurogh, Scarhuhadih, Ruthcuhogah and Wathetdianeh. Richard Bennett, Thomas March, William Fuller, Leo Strong and Edward Lloyd were the signers for the colonial Maryland government. The Susquehannock were granted more men, cannons, and ammunition under the conditions of the treaty, in exchange for land.

The treaty was renewed in 1661.

While the Susquehannock are now extinct as a people, there are efforts to push universities and other public institutions in the Baltimore area to institute land acknowledgement policies regarding the Susquehannock and other Native peoples of Maryland. A copy of the treaty on microfiche is held by the Maryland State Archives.

See also 
1666 Articles of Peace and Amity
Land acknowledgement
List of treaties
Susquehannock

References 

1652 in the Thirteen Colonies
1652 treaties
Anti-indigenous racism in North America
Province of Maryland
English colonization of the Americas
History of racism in Maryland
Native American history of Maryland
Susquehannock
Treaties of England
Treaties of indigenous peoples of North America